Fatrurazi bin Rozi (born 15 May 1978) is a Malaysian footballer who is currently playing for Pos Malaysia FC in Malaysia Premier League.

He previously played for ATM FA, Felda United FC, Selangor Public Bank, Kelantan FA, Malacca FA, PKNS FC and PDRM FA.

External links
 Biodata Fatrurazi Rozi 
 

Living people
Malaysian footballers
Malaysian people of Malay descent
1978 births
PKNS F.C. players
Kelantan FA players
Malacca FA players
People from Kelantan
Association football forwards